All at Once is the seventh studio album by American indie rock band Screaming Females, released on February 23, 2018, by Don Giovanni Records. It was produced by the band and Matt Bayles.

Music videos were recorded for the songs "Deeply", "Glass House" and "I'll Make You Sorry", with the last directed by Lance Bangs.
 
One of the album's songs refers to the American abstract painter Agnes Martin.

Track listing

Personnel
Personnel adapted from album liner notes.

Screaming Females
Mike Abbate – bass guitar
Jarrett Dougherty – drums, percussion, Moog
Marissa Paternoster – vocals, guitar, keyboards

Additional musicians
Alex Abrams – cello (track 1)
Brendan Canty – drums (track 7)
Nouela Johnston – piano (track 11)

Charts

References

Screaming Females albums
Don Giovanni Records albums
2018 albums